Saraye Moshir is traditional Bazaar in Shiraz, Southern city of Iran. It was founded more than 250 years ago under the order of government general of Fars province in Shiraz named Mirza Abolhassan MoshirolMolk. It was made as bazaar in The first days of its establishment. In some days this place was used as a museum and also as a traditional restaurant and Tea-Serving center. 
After 1979 revolution in Iran, it was closed for some years. Nowadays, it’s a historic site that hosts many artists and crafts, which attracts local visitors and international tourists.

See also
 Bazaar
 Bazaari
 Iranian architecture
 Market (place)
 Retail
 Souq

Buildings and structures in Shiraz
Architecture in Iran
Bazaars in Iran
Tourist attractions in Shiraz
Fars Province